Wyatt Cephus Hedrick (December 17, 1888 in Chatham, Virginia – May 5, 1964 in Houston, Texas) was an American architect, engineer, and developer most active in Texas and the American South. He began his career as an engineer, working in Virginia and Texas. He started his own firm in Fort Worth, and later merged with the architecture firm of Sanguinet & Staats before buying out the interests of the senior partners.

Early life
Wyatt Cephus Hedrick was born December 17, 1888 in Chatham, Virginia to Washington Henry and Emma Cephas (Williams) Hedrick. He matriculated at Roanoke College, gaining his bachelor's degree in 1909. He earned a degree in engineering the next year from Washington and Lee University.

Career
In 1910, Hedrick started a career in engineering, working briefly for Lane Brothers in his home state. Later that year he accepted a position at the Dallas office of Stone and Webster Engineering Corporation. He was a construction engineer for about three years.

In 1914, Hedrick started his own engineering firm in Fort Worth under the name of Wyatt C. Hedrick Construction Company.

Hedrick was accepted into the partnership of Sanguinet & Staats in 1921, an architecture firm based in Fort Worth which specialized in skyscrapers.

After a year, Hedrick began his work as an architect in Fort Worth, Texas, and three years later opened his own office. He was responsible for many of the tallest buildings in Fort Worth, and several of his works are included on the National Register of Historic Places. Fort Worth's first Art Moderne skyscraper, the Worth Theatre (1927), was designed by Hedrick while partnered with Sanguinet & Staats.

Hedrick worked mainly in a stripped-down classical style.  With his extensive university and government work, at one time his firm was the third-largest in the United States.

Hedrick is also known for his eight Texas courthouses, all of which are still standing.  They include: Austin County, Brazoria County, Coke County, Coleman County, Comanche, County, Kent County, Motley County, and Yoakum County.

Personal life
In 1918 he married Pauline Stripling. In 1925, he married Mildred Sterling, and in 1931 his father-in-law, Ross S. Sterling, became governor of Texas.

Works
A list of works by Hedrick in chronological order, with shared attribution where applicable:

One or more works in Wharton County Courthouse Historic Commercial District, Roughly bounded by the alley N of Milam St., Rusk St., Elm St. and Richmond St. Wharton, TX, NRHP-listed

References

Bibliography
 
 
  Master's thesis.

External links

Texas Courthouses on Texas Escapes.com

1888 births
1964 deaths
Architects from Texas
Roanoke College alumni
Washington and Lee University alumni
People from Chatham, Virginia
Architects from Virginia
20th-century American architects